Patrick Lechi Edema (born 27 August 1992) is a Ugandan professional footballer who plays for Eléctrico.

Club career
He made his professional debut in the Segunda Liga for Beira-Mar on 31 August 2014 in a game against Sporting B.

International career
He represented the Uganda U20s at the 2010 CECAFA U-20 Championship.

References

External links
 
 

1992 births
Sportspeople from Kampala
Living people
Ugandan footballers
Proline FC players
Saint George S.C. players
Ugandan expatriate footballers
Expatriate footballers in Ethiopia
Expatriate footballers in Portugal
S.C. Beira-Mar players
Liga Portugal 2 players
Anadia F.C. players
SC Victoria University players
Association football forwards
Ugandan expatriate sportspeople in Ethiopia
Ugandan expatriate sportspeople in Portugal
Uganda under-20 international footballers
2011 African Nations Championship players
Uganda A' international footballers